Andrew James Summers (born 31 December 1942) is an English guitarist who was a member of the rock band the Police. He was inducted into the Rock and Roll Hall of Fame as a band member in 2003. Summers has recorded solo albums, collaborated with other musicians, composed film scores, and exhibited his photography in galleries.

Early life
Andrew James Summers was born in Poulton-le-Fylde, Lancashire, England, on 31 December 1942.

During his childhood, his family moved to Bournemouth, which was then in Hampshire. After several years of piano lessons, he took up the guitar.

At an early age, he played jazz guitar. In his teens, he saw a concert by Thelonious Monk and Dizzy Gillespie in London that left a lasting impression. By 16,  he was playing in local clubs, and by 19, he had moved to London with his friend Zoot Money to form Zoot Money's Big Roll Band.

Musical career

Pre-Police career
Summers' professional career began in the mid-1960s in London as guitarist for the British rhythm and blues band Zoot Money's Big Roll Band, which eventually came under the influence of the psychedelic scene and evolved into the acid rock group Dantalian's Chariot. In September 1966, Summers was the first guitarist encountered by Jimi Hendrix after landing in the UK. The young Summers is portrayed in fiction as one of the "two main love interests" in Jenny Fabian and Johnny Byrne's 1969 book Groupie, in which he is given the pseudonym "Davey".

After the demise of Dantalian's Chariot, Summers joined Soft Machine for three months and toured the United States. For a brief time in 1968, he was a member of the Animals, then known as Eric Burdon and the Animals, with whom he recorded one album, Love Is. The album features a recording of Traffic's "Coloured Rain", which includes a 4minute and 15 second guitar solo by Summers. The LP also included a reworked version of Dantalian's Chariot's sole single "Madman Running Through the Fields".

After five years in Los Angeles, mostly spent studying classical guitar and composition in the music programme at California State University, Northridge, from which he graduated in 1972, he returned to London with his American girlfriend, Kate Lunken.

In London, Summers recorded and toured with acts including Kevin Coyne, Jon Lord, Joan Armatrading, David Essex, Neil Sedaka and Kevin Ayers. In October 1975 he participated in an orchestral rendition of Mike Oldfield's Tubular Bells.

In 1977, Summers was invited by ex-Gong bassist Mike Howlett to join his band Strontium 90, but was soon coaxed away by future Police bandmates Sting and Stewart Copeland.

The Police

Summers achieved international fame as the guitarist for the Police, which he joined in 1977, eventually replacing original guitarist Henry Padovani. Emerging from London's punk scene, the Police gained international renown with many hit songs, including "Message in a Bottle", "Roxanne", "Don't Stand So Close to Me", "Every Breath You Take", and "Every Little Thing She Does is Magic". During his time with the band, Summers twice won a Grammy Award for Best Rock Instrumental Performance, first in 1979 for "Reggatta de Blanc" (written with Copeland and Sting) and in 1980 for "Behind My Camel". 

Although Sting was the lead singer of the band, Summers occasionally contributed lead vocals, as in "Be My Girl/Sally" (1978), "Friends" (1980), "Mother" (1983), and "Someone to Talk To" (1983). Other notable Summers compositions from this period are "Omegaman" (which would have been released as the debut single from the 1981 Ghost in the Machine album had Sting not objected), "Shambelle" (1981), "Once Upon a Daydream," and "Murder by Numbers" both co-written with Sting (both 1983). In early 1984, after seven years together and record sales around 80 million, the Police disbanded.

Summers wrote the guitar riff for "Every Breath You Take", though was not given a songwriting credit. It was recorded in one take with his 1961 Fender Stratocaster during the Synchronicity sessions. The song was number one for eight weeks. Sting won the 1983 Grammy Award for Song of the Year, and the Police won Best Pop Performance by a Duo Or Group With Vocal for this song. Summers provides an account of the session in his memoir, One Train Later.

As a member of the Police, Summers created a trademark guitar sound, which relied heavily on a chorus effect. He explained in 2017 how the sound came about:

"I created it sort of out of necessity; my mission was 'We're going to play for two hours each night as a trio,' so I wanted to have this fantastic, coloured guitar sound that was different for every song. So, I used the Echoplex, then a chorus, and a few other pedals…envelope filters. As we went on, I acquired more stuff and got a Pete Cornish board, but what was driving it was to invade and push the edge of what the guitar was supposed to sound like, and make it really interesting over a show. So, it wasn't just one straight sound all the time. I could move it around. And it was appreciated by many millions of people (laughs). Of course, it's very tired and a bit 'retro' now; I'm not very keen on it anymore. But in those days it was new, fresh, and exciting."

Post-Police

Summers's solo career has included recording, touring, composing for films (including Down and Out in Beverly Hills and Weekend at Bernie's), and exhibiting his photography in art galleries around the world.

He recorded the duet albums I Advance Masked (1982) and Bewitched (1984) with guitarist Robert Fripp of King Crimson, as well as duet albums with Victor Biglione, John Etheridge, and Benjamin Verdery. His solo debut album, XYZ, was released in 1987 and is the only noninstrumental album in his solo catalogue. Although it included pop material, such as the single "Love is the Strangest Way", it failed to dent the charts. In 1987, Sting invited Summers to perform on his second album ...Nothing Like the Sun, a favour the singer returned by playing bass on Charming Snakes (1990) and later contributing vocals to "'Round Midnight" on Summers' tribute album to Thelonious Monk, Green Chimneys, in 1999. In the mid-1990s Summers briefly returned to a more rock-oriented sound with Synesthesia (1995) and The Last Dance of Mr X (1997) before recording a string of jazz albums. He also participated in the formation of Animal Logic. In 1992, he led the house band (credited as musical director) for The Dennis Miller Show.

The Police reunion

During the 2007 Grammy Awards show, the Police played "Roxanne" and subsequently announced that they would be going on tour. The Police Reunion Tour began in Vancouver, Canada, on 28 May 2007 and continued until August 2008, becoming the third-highest-grossing tour of all time.

Circa Zero 
In August 2013, Summers announced he had formed the band Circa Zero with Rob Giles from the Rescues. Originally, drummer Emmanuelle Caplette was also a member of the band. Their debut show was 25 July 2013 at the El Rey Theatre in Los Angeles. The band's debut album, Circus Hero, was released 25 March 2014. It is titled after a malapropism of the band's name made by a radio disc jockey during an interview of Summers.

Call the Police 
In March 2017, Summers announced he had formed Call the Police, a Police tribute band, with two Brazilian musicians, Rodrigo Santos (Barão Vermelho or Red Baron) on bass guitar and vocals and Joao Barone (Os Paralamas do Sucesso) on drums.

Awards and honours
 Grammy Award, Best Rock Instrumental, "Reggatta de Blanc", 1979
 Grammy Award, Best Rock Instrumental, "Behind My Camel", 1980
 Rock and Roll Hall of Fame induction with the Police, 2003
 Chevalier of the Ordre des Arts et des Lettres, with the Police, 2007
 Honorary doctorate, Bournemouth University, 2008
 Hall of Fame, Guitar Player magazine
 Vote number one pop guitarist, five years, Guitar Player magazine
 Guiding Light Award, Progressive Music Awards, 2016
 85th guitarist of all time, Rolling Stone magazine
 Lifetime Achievement Award, Gibson Guitar Awards, 2000
 Lifetime Achievement Award, Roland and BOSS, 2017
 One Train Later (2006) was voted music book of the year by Mojo and was turned into the 2012 documentary Can't Stand Losing You: Surviving the Police. The documentary was released on DVD in July 2015.

Personal life
Summers was married to American singer Robin Lane between 1969 and 1970. He married his second wife, Kate, in 1973 and they had one daughter in 1978, Layla Zoe Summers. Summers' years with the Police took its toll on their marriage, however, leading them to divorce in 1981, although they remarried in 1985. In 1987, Kate and Andy's twin sons Maurice X and Anton Y were born. As of 2022, Summers resides in Santa Monica, California, with his wife and family.

Discography

Solo albums
 XYZ (MCA, 1987)
 Mysterious Barricades (Private Music, 1988)
 The Golden Wire (Private, 1989)
 Charming Snakes (Private, 1990)
 World Gone Strange (Private, 1991)
 Synaesthesia (CMP, 1995)
 The Last Dance of Mr. X (BMG/RCA Victor, 1997)
 A Windham Hill Retrospective (Windham Hill Records, 1998) (compilation)
 Green Chimneys: The Music of Thelonious Monk (BMG Classics/RCA Victor, 1999)
 Peggy's Blue Skylight (BMG Classics/RCA Victor, 2000)
 Earth + Sky (Golden Wire, 2003)
 The X Tracks (Golden Wire, 2004) (compilation)
 Metal Dog (Flickering Shadow, 2015)
 Triboluminescence (Flickering Shadow, 2017)
 Harmonics of the Night (Flickering Shadow, 2021)

Collaborations 
 I Advance Masked with Robert Fripp (A&M, 1982) – rec. 1981–82
 Bewitched with Robert Fripp (A&M, 1984)
 Invisible Threads with John Etheridge (Mesa, 1993)
 Strings of Desire with Victor Biglione (R.A.R.E., 1998)
 Splendid Brazil with Victor Biglione (R.A.R.E., 2005)
 First You Build a Cloud with Ben Verdery (R.A.R.E., 2007)
 Fundamental with Fernanda Takai (Deck, 2012)
 Circus Hero with Rob Giles as Circa Zero (429, 2014) – rec. 2013

Film soundtracks 
 The Wild Life (MCA, 1984)
 2010 (A&M, 1984) – contributor
 Band of the Hand (1985)
 Down and Out in Beverly Hills (MCA, 1986)
 Weekend at Bernie's (Arista, 1989)
 The Craft (Columbia, 1996)

Singles
 "Parade"/"Train" with Robert Fripp (1984)
 "2010"/"To Hal and Back" (1984)
 "Love is the Strangest Way"/"Nowhere" (1987)
 "Bring on the Night" (Police cover) with 40 Fingers (2022)

As band member
With The Police

 Outlandos d'Amour (1978)
 Reggatta de Blanc (1979)
 Zenyatta Mondatta (1980)
 Ghost in the Machine (1981)
 Brimstone and Treacle (1982)
 Synchronicity (1983)
 Every Breath You Take: The Singles (1986)
 Message in a Box: The Complete Recordings (1993)
 Live! (1995)
 The Police (2007)
 Certifiable: Live in Buenos Aires (2008)
 Every Move You Make: The Studio Recordings (2019)

With Eric Burdon and the Animals
 Love Is (1968)

With Kevin Ayers
 First Show in the Appearance Business (1996)
 Too Old to Die Young (1998)
 Yes We Have No Mananas, So Get Your Mananas Today (EMI/Harvest, 2009)

With Kevin Coyne
 Matching Head and Feet (Virgin, 1975)
 Heartburn (Virgin, 1976)
 In Living Black and White (Virgin, 1976)
 Sign of the Times (Virgin, 1994)
 On Air (Tradition & Moderne, 2008)

With Dantalian's Chariot
 Chariot Rising (Wooden Hill, 1996)

With Eberhard Schoener
 The Book (Ariola 1977)
 Trance-Formation (Harvest/EMI Electrola 1977)
 Video-Flashback (Harvest, 1979)
 Video Magic (Harvest, 1978)

With Strontium 90
 Police Academy (Pangaea, 1997)

With Zoot Money's Big Roll Band
 It Should Have Been Me (1965)
 Zoot! (Columbia, 1966)
 Transition (1968)
 Were You There? (Indigo, 1999)
 Fully Clothed & Naked (Indigo, 2000)

As guest
 Joan Armatrading, Back to the Night (A&M, 1975)
 Manuel Barrueco, Nylon & Steel (Angel, 2001)
 David Bedford, The Odyssey (Virgin, 1976)
 Gregg Bissonette, Gregg Bissonette (Mascot, 1998)
 Toni Childs, House of Hope (A&M, 1991)
 Deeyah Khan, Ataraxis (Heilo, 2007)
 Jo Jo Laine, Dancin' Man (Polydor, 1980)
 Jon Lord, Sarabande, (Purple, 1976)
 Juicy Lucy, Blue Thunder (Outer Music, 1996)
 Roberto Menescal, Bossa Nova Meets the Beatles (Deck/Jingle Bells 2017)
 Anthony Moore, Out (Virgin, 1976)
 Paolo Rustichelli, Capri/Mystic Jazz (Verve Forecast, 1991)
 Neil Sedaka, Live at the Royal Festival Hall (Polydor, 1974)
 Michael Shrieve, Stiletto (Novus/RCA/BMG, 1989)
 Carly Simon, Hello Big Man (Warner Bros., 1983)
 Sting, ...Nothing Like the Sun (A&M, 1987)
 Andrew York, Centerpeace (2010)

Books 
 Throb (William Morrow, 1983)
 Light Strings (Chronicle, 2005)
 One Train Later (St Martins, 2006)
 I'll Be Watching You (Taschen, 2007)
 Desirer Walks the Streets (Nazraeli Press, 2008)
 The Bones of Chuang Tzu (Steidl, 2018)
 A Certain Strangeness (University of Texas Press, 2019)
 Fretted and Moaning (Rocket88, 2021)

References

External links

 
 The Police official site
 Circa Zero official website
 Interview: "Andy Summers: The Blessing and The Curse" - Rockerzine.com 2015
 BBC interview with Andy Summers including audio
 Book Review of Andy Summers' One Train Later
 Police Guitarist Andy Summers to Release Short Story Debut, 'Fretted and Moaning'
 

1942 births
Living people
People from Poulton-le-Fylde
People from Chipping Barnet
British rhythm and blues boom musicians
California State University, Northridge alumni
Canterbury scene
Chevaliers of the Ordre des Arts et des Lettres
English jazz guitarists
English male guitarists
English new wave musicians
English rock guitarists
Jazz fusion guitarists
Lead guitarists
British male jazz musicians
A&M Records artists
Private Music artists
Progressive rock guitarists
The Animals members
The Police members
Soft Machine members
Strontium 90 (band) members
Spooky Tooth members